A binary image is one that consists of pixels that can have one of exactly two colors, usually black and white. Binary images are also called bi-level or two-level, Pixelart made of two colours is often referred to as 1-Bit or 1bit. This means that each pixel is stored as a single bit—i.e., a 0 or 1. The names black-and-white, B&W, monochrome or monochromatic are often used for this concept, but may also designate any images that have only one sample per pixel, such as grayscale images. In Photoshop parlance, a binary image is the same as an image in "Bitmap" mode.

Binary images often arise in digital image processing as masks or thresholding, and dithering.  Some input/output devices, such as laser printers, fax machines, and bilevel computer displays, can only handle bilevel images.

A binary image can be stored in memory as a bitmap, a packed array of bits. A 640×480 image requires 37.5 KiB of storage.  Because of the small size of the image files, fax machine and document management solutions usually use this format. Most binary images also compress well with simple run-length compression schemes.

Binary images can be interpreted as subsets of the two-dimensional integer lattice Z2; the field of morphological image processing was largely inspired by this view.

Operations on binary images 
An entire class of operations on binary images operates on a 3×3 window of the image. This contains nine pixels, so 29 or 512 possible values. Considering only the central pixel, it is possible to define whether it remains set or unset, based on the surrounding pixels. Examples of such operations are thinning, dilating, finding branch points and endpoints, removing isolated pixels, shifting the image a pixel in any direction, and breaking H-connections. Conway's Game of Life is also an example of a 3×3 window operation.

Another class of operations is based on the notion of filtering with a structuring element. The structuring element is binary image, usually small, which is passed over the target image, in a similar manner to a filter in gray scale image processing. Since the pixels can only have two values, the morphological operations are erosion (any unset pixels within the structuring element cause the pixel to be unset) and dilation (any set pixels within the structuring element cause the pixel to be set). Important operations are morphological opening and morphological closing which consist of erosion followed by dilation and dilation followed by erosion, respectively, using the same structuring element. Opening tends to enlarge small holes, remove small objects, and separate objects. Closing retains small objects, removes holes, and joins objects.

A very important characteristic of a binary image is the distance transform. This gives the distance of every set pixel from the nearest unset pixel. The distance transform can be efficiently calculated. It allows efficient computation of Voronoi diagrams, where each pixel in an image is assigned to the nearest of a set of points. It also allows skeletonization, which differs from thinning in that skeletons allow recovery of the original image. The distance transform is also useful for determining the center of the object, and for matching in image recognition.

Another class of operations is gathering orientation-free metrics. This is often important in image recognition where the orientation of the camera needs to be removed. Orientation-free metrics of a group of connected or surrounded pixels include the Euler number, the perimeter, the area, the compactness, the area of holes, the minimum radius, the maximum radius.

Image segmentation 
Binary images are produced from color images by segmentation. Segmentation is the process of assigning each pixel in the source image to two or more classes. If there are more than two classes then the usual result is several binary images. The simplest form of segmentation is probably Otsu's method which assigns pixels to foreground or background based on grayscale intensity. Another method is the watershed algorithm. Edge detection also often creates a binary image with some pixels assigned to edge pixels, and is also a first step in further segmentation.

Skeletons 
Thinning or skeletonization produces binary images which consist of pixel-wide lines. The branchpoints and endpoints can then be extracted, and the image converted to a graph. This is important in image recognition, for example in optical character recognition.

Interpretation 
The interpretation of the pixel's binary value is also device-dependent. Some systems interprets the bit value of 0 as black and 1 as white, while others reversed the meaning of the values. In the TWAIN standard PC interface for scanners and digital cameras, the first flavor is called vanilla and the reversed one chocolate.

Dithering is often used for displaying halftone images.

1-Bit in digital art 

Binary pixelart, better known as 1-Bit or 1bit art, has been a method of displaying graphics since early computers. While 
early computers such as the zx81 used the restriction as a necessity of the hardware, hand-held LCD games such as Game & Watch and Tamagotchi, alongside early computers with a focus on graphic user interfaces like the Macintosh made large steps in promoting the culture, technique and aesthetic of the restrictions of 1-bit art.

Modern examples of 1bit art are visible in indie videogames and other digital art. Best-seller games like Gato Roboto, Return of the Obra Dinn, Minit and World of Horror use 1bit as a style to give their games a retro feel  or to simply save the graphic designers time in development. There is even new 1-Bit hardware in development, such as the experimental handheld console Playdate.

For pixel artists, 1-Bit has become a common challenge for creating art. The pixelart contest Pixtogether required its participants to use only two colours for its 10th monthly contest. Not a lot of artists mainly do 1bit art, but many of them stay in contact with each other to exchange knowledge about working with the restriction, and hosting own collaborations.

Brandon James Greer, who makes popular youtube tutorials  on 1bit and other pixel artwork, says that "the restriction leads to some unique approaches" and that working in 1-Bit is "a very fun and unique challenge".

While 1bit can be called an art style itself, each piece falls under a second style too. Obvious differences in 1bit art styles are for example whether, how much and what kind of dithering is being used, the image resolution, the use of outlines and how detailed the artwork is.

Image sensor capture binary images 
Oversampled binary image sensor is a new image sensor that is reminiscent of traditional photographic film. Each pixel in the sensor has a binary response, giving only a one-bit quantized measurement of the local light intensity.

See also
 Black-and-white
 Connected-component labeling
 Discrete tomography
 Netpbm format
 JBIG/JBIG2
 X BitMap
 X PixMap
 Oversampled binary image sensor

References

External links
 Monochrome Bitmaps

1
Image processing
Digital geometry
2 (number)